Douglas M. Warhit is an author, director, actor, acting instructor, licensed psychotherapist, and life coach in Los Angeles, California.  He has appeared in the films Beverly Hills Cop, Look Who's Talking, and Christine.  He has guest starred on the television shows as NYPD Blue, ALF, and as the Ferengi Kazago in the Star Trek: The Next Generation episode The Battle.

Warhit has written three books, Book the Job: 143 Things Actors Need to Know to Make It Happen, The Actor's Audition Checklist, and Warhit's Guidebook For The Actor.  He has been named "One of the Top Ten Acting Coaches in Los Angeles" by Backstage magazine. and The Hollywood Reporter.

Warhit has an undergraduate degree from New York University and a master's degree from Antioch University.

Filmography

References

External links
 Official Doug Warhit Website
 
 Doug Warhit at Yahoo Movies

Year of birth missing (living people)
Living people
New York University alumni
American non-fiction writers
American male film actors
American male television actors
Life coaches